The Confederación Española de Cooperativas de Trabajo Asociado (COCETA English: The Spanish Confederation of Cooperatives of Work Associate) is a cooperative federation whose aims are the Spanish defense of the interests of the cooperatives of production or work associate.

References

External links

Cooperatives in Spain
Cooperative federations